"Dy-Na-Mi-Tee" is a song by British rapper Ms. Dynamite, released as the  second single from her debut studio album, A Little Deeper (2002), on 26 August 2002. It reached number five on the UK Singles Chart that September, her highest position reached to date on the chart until "Dibby Dibby Sound" with DJ Fresh reached number three in 2014. The song also reached the top 40 in Italy, New Zealand, Spain, and Switzerland.

Ms. Dynamite performed the track at the Live 8 concert in Hyde Park, London. There is a remix of the song featuring Nas and produced by Swizz Beatz.

Track listings
UK and Australian CD single
 "Dy-Na-Mi-Tee"
 "Dy-Na-Mi-Tee" (Yoruba soul mix)
 "It Takes More" (Radio 1 Live Lounge)
 "Dy-Na-Mi-Tee" (video)

UK 12-inch and cassette single
 "Dy-Na-Mi-Tee"
 "Dy-Na-Mi-Tee" (Yoruba soul mix)

Charts

Weekly charts

Year-end charts

Certifications

References

Ms. Dynamite songs
2002 singles
2002 songs
Music videos directed by Jake Nava
Polydor Records singles
Song recordings produced by Salaam Remi
Songs about childhood
Songs written by Ms. Dynamite
Songs written by Salaam Remi